KoronaPay is brand of Russian payment system Zolotaya Korona that provides a range of consumer payment services.

In 2020, the Zolotaya Korona (KoronaPay) payment system had a turnover of over 1 trillion roubles.

History 

Payment system Zolotaya Korona was founded in 1994 in Novosibirsk.

In 2006 Russian payment system Zolotaya Korona won open tender of Novosibirsk city hall for supply of Social cards. In 2008 Zolotaya Korona became a laureate of biggest national award in financial sphere "Financial elite of the South" in nomination "Most reliable bank card". In October 2009, Zolotaya Korona became a member of "Sibirian Transport Union".

In 2012 operation of Zolotaya Korona was prohibited in the territory of Armenia because of the violation of law and licence.

In September 2013 Zolotaya Korona was officially recognized as socially important payment system by the Central Bank of Russia.

In October 2016 Ukraine banned operations of Zolotaya Korona and all other Russian payment systems as part of its sanction policy against the Russian military intervention in Ukraine.

In February 2017 Zolotaya Korona was officially recognized as socially important payment system by National Bank of Kazakhstan. In 2018 Zolotaya Korona was recognized as the best system for P2P money transfers without a bank account based on the results of a cross-industry payment market study, “P2P money transfers in Russia 2018”, conducted by Frank RG.

On March 25, 2021, Central Bank of Russia excluded Zolotaya Korona from the registry of socially important payment systems.

European launch 

In December 2018, KoronaPay Europe Limited was granted an Electronic Money Institution (EMI) license №115.1.3.30/2018 by the Central Bank of Cyprus.

At the first stage, KoronaPay Europe Limited is focusing on money transfers from Europe to Russia and other CIS countries. The Russia/CIS – Europe corridors will be launched at the next stage followed by the expansion of the service to intra-European corridors.

KoronaPay's launch in Poland was viewed by some finance experts as a serious challenge to the leading fintech companies present in the region, especially in the segment of P2P money transfers to Ukraine. Over a six-month period, a KoronaPay user in Europe can send: up to 1,000 EUR with no proof of identity required; up to 5,000 EUR – proof of identity required (passport or other ID); up to 15,000 EUR – proof of address required; over 15,000 EUR – proof of income required. As of May 2021, KoronaPay did not charge any commission fee on money transfers and claims to keep a minimum exchange rate margin, less than 0.5 per cent. The KoronaPay business model, according to the company’s top management, is based on making profit from provision of extra services (e.g. e-wallets, prepaid cards, service charges, etc.) that are planned to go live in 2022.

References 

Financial services companies established in 1994
Financial services companies of Russia
Companies based in Novosibirsk
Interbank networks
Credit cards
Russian brands
Products introduced in 1994